Sympistis sakhmet is a moth of the family Noctuidae. It is found in New Mexico. The wingspan is about 31 mm.

References

External links
 Images at mothphotographersgroup

sakhmet
Moths described in 2008